Gadsby is a surname. Notable people with the surname include:

Bill Gadsby (1927–2016), Canadian professional ice hockey player
Ernie Gadsby (1884–1963), English footballer
Hannah Gadsby (born 1978), Australian actor and comedian
Henry Gadsby (1842–1907), English composer and organist
Jon Gadsby (born 1953), New Zealand television comedian and writer
Matt Gadsby (1979–2006), English footballer
Mick Gadsby (born 1947), English footballer
Walter Gadsby (born 1872), English footballer
Walter Gadsby (1882–1961), English footballer
William Gadsby (1773–1844), English hymn writer and Baptist pastor